Nicholas Delton Thompson (born June 23, 1981) is a retired American mixed martial artist. A professional from 2003 until 2011, he competed for the Ultimate Fighting Championship (UFC), Strikeforce, Bellator Fighting Championships, and Bodog Fight. He is the former Bodog Fight Lightweight Champion.

Background
While attending college, Nick wrestled at the University of Wisconsin from 2000–2002. He then began training with coach Dave Strasser at Dave Strasser’s Freestyle Academy in Kenosha, Wisconsin. While there, he trained with manager Pat O'Malley, Ron Faircloth, Nick Agallar, and Brian Geraghty. 
In 2005, Nick moved to attend the University of Minnesota Law School. He began training under coach Greg Nelson at Minnesota Martial Arts Academy.  Nelson is closely affiliated with Erik Paulson, founder of Combat Submission Wrestling.
While there, Nick trained with fighters Sean Sherk, Brock Lesnar, Brock Larson, Nik Lentz, Derrick Noble, Paul Bradley, and Kaitlin Young. Thereafter, he was awarded a black belt in jiujitsu by James Peterson.

Mixed martial arts career

UFC
He made his UFC debut at UFC 56 where he defeated Keith Wisniewski. He returned to the UFC on April 15, 2006, where he lost against the highly ranked and seasoned judoka Karo Parisyan at UFC 59.

Bodog Fight
Following his fights in the UFC, and after three warm-up fights with smaller organizations, Thompson signed with Bodog Fight, a former MMA organisation.  After cutting through three Bodog opponents, Thompson was offered his title fight with Eddie Alvarez, a previously undefeated fighter. After winning his fight against Alvarez on April 14, 2007, Thompson has since defended his title twice.

World Victory Road
Nick's final title defense against John Troyer was the last fight on his contract with Bodog.
Rumors of his intent to sign with World Victory Road were confirmed with his addition to the organization's March 3, 2008 inaugural Sengoku show.  Nick was scheduled to face Fabricio Monteiro in his debut.  He won this debut against Monteiro via three-round unanimous decision.

EliteXC
Nick fought Jake Shields on July 26, 2008 for the newly created EliteXC Welterweight title, losing via submission in the first round.

Strikeforce
On February 25, 2009 in a radio interview, Thompson confirmed that he has signed on with California-based Mixed Martial Arts promotion Strikeforce. Thomson stated in his interview that he could be fighting as early as April 11, 2009.

Shine Fights
Nick signed a multi-fight deal with upstart, Ohio and Florida based promotion, Shine Fights. Before even making his debut, he was requested to a new deal.

Ultimate Glory
Nick was supposed to fight Siyar Bahadurzada at Ultimate Glory 12 on Oct. 16th, 2010 in Amsterdam, Netherlands, but had to pull out at the last minute due to an injury. He was replaced by Derrick Noble.

Personal life
Nick is the father of three children—Claire, Joey, and Grace. Nick is also a founding partner at Casey Jones Law.

Mixed martial arts record

|-
| Loss
| align=center| 38–14–1
| Ben Askren
| Decision (unanimous)
| Bellator 40
| 
| align=center| 3
| align=center| 5:00
| Newkirk, Oklahoma, United States
| 
|-
| Loss
| align=center| 38–13–1
| Taisuke Okuno
| KO (punch)
| World Victory Road Presents: Sengoku Raiden Championships 14
| 
| align=center| 3
| align=center| 0:27
| Saitama, Japan
| 
|-
| Loss
| align=center| 38–12–1
| Dan Hornbuckle
| TKO (punches)
| World Victory Road Presents: Sengoku 10
| 
| align=center| 2
| align=center| 1:30
| Saitama, Japan
| 
|-
| Loss
| align=center| 38–11–1
| Tim Kennedy
| TKO (submission to punches)
| Strikeforce Challengers: Villasenor vs. Cyborg
| 
| align=center| 2
| align=center| 2:37
| Kent, Washington, United States
| 
|-
| Win
| align=center| 38–10–1
| Paul Daley
| Decision (unanimous)
| MFC 20
| 
| align=center| 3
| align=center| 5:00
| Edmonton, Alberta, Canada
| 
|-
| Win
| align=center| 37–10–1
| Travis McCullough
| TKO (submission to punches)
| MT 18
| 
| align=center| 1
| align=center| 2:38
| Madison, Wisconsin, United States
| 
|-
| Loss
| align=center| 
| Jake Shields
| Submission (guillotine choke)
| EliteXC: Unfinished Business
| 
| align=center| 1
| align=center| 1:03
| Stockton, California, United States
| 
|-
| Win
| align=center| 36–9–1
| Michael Costa
| Submission (kimura)
| World Victory Road Presents: Sengoku 3
| 
| align=center| 2
| align=center| 4:13
| Saitama, Japan
| 
|-
| Win
| align=center| 35–9–1
| Fabricio Monteiro
| Decision (unanimous)
| World Victory Road Presents: Sengoku First Battle
| 
| align=center| 3
| align=center| 5:00
| Tokyo, Japan
| 
|-
| Win
| align=center| 34–9–1
| John Troyer
| Submission (rear-naked choke)
| Bodog Fight: Thompson vs. Troyer
| 
| align=center| 1
| align=center| 3:46
| Las Vegas, Nevada, United States
| 
|-
| Win
| align=center| 33–9–1
| Mark Weir
| TKO (punches)
| Bodog Fight: Vancouver
| 
| align=center| 1
| align=center| 4:01
| Vancouver, British Columbia, Canada
| 
|-
| Win
| align=center| 32–9–1
| Eddie Alvarez
| TKO (punches)
| Bodog Fight: Clash of the Nations
| 
| align=center| 2
| align=center| 4:32
| St. Petersburg, Russia
| 
|-
| Win
| align=center| 31–9–1
| Dustin Denes
| TKO (punches)
| Bodog Fight: Costa Rica
| 
| align=center| 1
| align=center| 1:27
| Costa Rica
| 
|-
| Win
| align=center| 30–9–1
| Ansar Chalangov
| Submission (rear-naked choke)
| Bodog Fight: USA vs Russia
| 
| align=center| 1
| align=center| 4:59
| St. Petersburg, Russia
| 
|-
| Win
| align=center| 29–9–1
| Joe Winterfeldt
| TKO (referee stoppage)
| Twin Cities Throwdown 3
| 
| align=center| 1
| align=center| N/A
| Burnsville, Minnesota, United States
| 
|-
| Win
| align=center| 28–9–1
| Davion Peterson
| Submission (rear-naked choke)
| Bodog Fight: Costa Rica
| 
| align=center| 3
| align=center| N/A
| Costa Rica
| 
|-
| Win
| align=center| 27–9–1
| Steven Bratland
| Submission (rear-naked choke)
| XKK: St. Joseph
| 
| align=center| 1
| align=center| N/A
| St. Joseph, Minnesota, United States
| 
|-
| Win
| align=center| 26–9–1
| Yancy Cuellar
| TKO (punches)
| XKK: St. Joseph
| 
| align=center| 1
| align=center| N/A
| St. Joseph, Minnesota, United States
| 
|-
| Win
| align=center| 25–9–1
| Chris Wilson
| Submission (kimura)
| Absolute Fighting Championships 17
| 
| align=center| 2
| align=center| 2:08
| Fort Lauderdale, Florida, United States
| 
|-
| Loss
| align=center| 24–9–1
| Karo Parisyan
| TKO (submission to punches)
| UFC 59: Reality Check
| 
| align=center| 1
| align=center| 4:44
| Anaheim, California, United States
| 
|-
| Win
| align=center| 24–8–1
| Alex Carter
| Submission (triangle choke)
| EFX: Fury
| 
| align=center| 1
| align=center| N/A
| Minnesota, United States
| 
|-
| Win
| align=center| 23–8–1
| Anthony White
| TKO (submission to punches)
| Madtown Throwdown 6
| 
| align=center| 1
| align=center| N/A
| Madison, Wisconsin, United States
| 
|-
| Win
| align=center| 22–8–1
| Keith Wisniewski
| Decision (unanimous)
| UFC 56
| 
| align=center| 3
| align=center| 5:00
| Las Vegas, Nevada, United States
| 
|-
| Win
| align=center| 21–8–1
| Josh Neer
| Submission (rear-naked choke)
| Extreme Challenge 64
| 
| align=center| 2
| align=center| 2:19
| Osceola, Iowa, United States
| 
|-
| Win
| align=center| 20–8–1
| Dereck Keasley
| Submission (choke)
| Freestyle Fighting Championship 16
| 
| align=center| 1
| align=center| 3:48
| Tunica, Mississippi, United States
| 
|-
| Win
| align=center| 19–8–1
| Victor Moreno
| Submission (guillotine choke)
| Freestyle Fighting Championship 16
| 
| align=center| 2
| align=center| 0:52
| Tunica, Mississippi, United States
| 
|-
| Win
| align=center| 18–8–1
| Chris Connelly
| Decision (unanimous)
| Freestyle Fighting Championship 16
| 
| align=center| 2
| align=center| 5:00
| Tunica, Mississippi, United States
| 
|-
| Win
| align=center| 17–8–1
| Brian Fitzsimmons
| KO (punches)
| Madtown Throwdown 4
| 
| align=center| 1
| align=center| N/A
| Madison, Wisconsin, United States
| 
|-
| Loss
| align=center| 16–8–1
| Ed Herman
| TKO (injury)
| Hand 2 Hand Combat
| 
| align=center| 1
| align=center| N/A
| Canton, Ohio, United States
| 
|-
| Loss
| align=center| 16–7–1
| Yushin Okami
| Submission (elbow injury)
| GCM: D.O.G. 2
| 
| align=center| 1
| align=center| 0:29
| Tokyo, Japan
| 
|-
| Win
| align=center| 16–6–1
| Marcel Ferreira
| TKO (punches)
| Absolute Fighting Championships 12
| 
| align=center| 3
| align=center| 2:48
| Fort Lauderdale, Florida, United States
| 
|-
| Win
| align=center| 15–6–1
| Joey Clark
| Submission (armbar)
| XKK: St. Paul
| 
| align=center| 1
| align=center| 3:01
| St. Paul, Minnesota, United States
| 
|-
| Win
| align=center| 14–6–1
| Nuri Shakir
| Submission (triangle choke)
| CZ 10: Ground War
| 
| align=center| 2
| align=center| 3:07
| Revere, Massachusetts, United States
|Won the vacant CZ Welterweight Championship.
|-
| Loss
| align=center| 13–6–1
| Paul Purcell
| KO (punches)
| Freestyle Combat Challenge 18
| 
| align=center| 2
| align=center| N/A
| Racine, Wisconsin, United States
| 
|-
| Win
| align=center| 13–5–1
| Brian Green
| TKO (punches)
| Madtown Throwdown 2
| 
| align=center| 1
| align=center| N/A
| Madison, Wisconsin, United States
| 
|-
| Win
| align=center| 12–5–1
| Brian Gassaway
| Decision (unanimous)
| Combat: Do Fighting Challenge 2
| 
| align=center| 3
| align=center| 3:00
| Illinois, United States
| 
|-
| Win
| align=center| 11–5–1
| Jesse Chilton
| Submission (rear-naked choke)
| Freestyle Combat Challenge 17
| 
| align=center| 3
| align=center| N/A
| Racine, Wisconsin, United States
| 
|-
| Win
| align=center| 10–5–1
| Darren Hines
| Submission (guillotine choke)
| Xtreme Fighting Organization 4
| 
| align=center| 1
| align=center| 0:19
| McHenry, Illinois, United States
| 
|-
| Draw
| align=center| 9–5–1
| Daryl Guthmiller
| Draw
| XKK: Fridley
| 
| align=center| 3
| align=center| 5:00
| Fridley, Minnesota, United States
| 
|-
| Loss
| align=center| 9–5
| Brian Ebersole
| TKO (punches)
| Freestyle Fighting Championships 12
| 
| align=center| 1
| align=center| N/A
| Racine, Wisconsin, United States
| 
|-
| Win
| align=center| 9–4
| Sean Huffman
| Submission (choke)
| Freestyle Fighting Championships 12
| 
| align=center| 2
| align=center| N/A
| Racine, Wisconsin, United States
| 
|-
| Win
| align=center| 8–4
| John Renken
| TKO (punches)
| Freestyle Fighting Championships 12
| 
| align=center| 1
| align=center| N/A
| Racine, Wisconsin, United States
| 
|-
| Win
| align=center| 7–4
| Ricky Seleuce
| Submission (twister)
| Madtown Throwdown 1
| 
| align=center| 1
| align=center| N/A
| Madison, Wisconsin, United States
| 
|-
| Win
| align=center| 6–4
| Thiago Goncalves
| TKO (submission to punches)
| Freestyle Combat Challenge 15
| 
| align=center| 2
| align=center| 2:39
| Racine, Wisconsin, United States
| 
|-
| Win
| align=center| 5–4
| Brian Moore
| Submission (guillotine choke)
| Ultimate Battleground
| 
| align=center| 1
| align=center| 0:28
| Madison, Wisconsin, United States
| 
|-
| Win
| align=center| 4–4
| Jeff Doyle
| TKO (corner stoppage)
| XKK: Mayhem in Marshfield
| 
| align=center| 2
| align=center| N/A
| Marshfield, Wisconsin, United States
| 
|-
| Loss
| align=center| 3–4
| Mike Quinlan
| Submission (rear-naked choke)
| Absolute Fighting Championships 8
| 
| align=center| 2
| align=center| 0:16
| Fort Lauderdale, Florida, United States
| 
|-
| Win
| align=center| 3–3
| Emyr Bussade
| Decision (unanimous)
| Freestyle Combat Challenge 14
| 
| align=center| 2
| align=center| 5:00
| Racine, Wisconsin, United States
| 
|-
| Win
| align=center| 2–3
| Kyle Helsper
| Submission (rear-naked choke)
| Freestyle Combat Challenge 13
| 
| align=center| 2
| align=center| 2:16
| Racine, Wisconsin, United States
| 
|-
| Loss
| align=center| 1–3
| Dan Hart
| Submission (guillotine choke)
| Freestyle Combat Challenge 12
| 
| align=center| 1
| align=center| 0:17
| Racine, Wisconsin, United States
| 
|-
| Loss
| align=center| 1–2
| Dustin Denes
| Submission (triangle choke)
| Absolute Fighting Championships 5
| 
| align=center| 1
| align=center| 1:45
| Fort Lauderdale, Florida, United States
| 
|-
| Win
| align=center| 1–1
| Kyle Helsper
| TKO (submission to punches)
| Freestyle Combat Challenge 11
| 
| align=center| 1
| align=center| N/A
| Racine, Wisconsin, United States
| 
|-
| Loss
| align=center| 0–1
| Dan Hart
| KO (punches)
| Freestyle Combat Challenge 10
| 
| align=center| 1
| align=center| N/A
| Racine, Wisconsin, United States
|

See also
List of male mixed martial artists

References

Videos
Nick Thompson Highlight

External links
Official Site
Official MySpace Page

 

1981 births
University of Wisconsin–Madison alumni
University of Minnesota Law School alumni
American male mixed martial artists
Living people
Welterweight mixed martial artists
Mixed martial artists utilizing collegiate wrestling
Sportspeople from Newport News, Virginia
People from Brooklyn Park, Minnesota
Ultimate Fighting Championship male fighters